A grande école is a specialised university that is separate from, but parallel and often connected to, the main framework of the French public university system. The grandes écoles offer teaching, research and professional training in single academic fields such as engineering, architecture, business administration, academic research, or public policy and administration. The schools only admit students through an extremely competitive examination process; a significant proportion of their graduates occupy senior positions in French business, academia, civil service and civil society. 

Grandes écoles primarily admit students based on their national ranking in competitive written and oral exams called concours, which are organised annually by the French central government. While anyone can register for concours, successful candidates have almost always completed two or three years of dedicated preparatory classes (classes préparatoires) prior to admission. 

Most grandes écoles are publicly funded and therefore have limited tuition costs. Some grandes écoles, especially business schools (Écoles de Commerce) are organised privately, and therefore have more costly tuitions.

Classification of grandes écoles

Origins 
The term grande école originated in 1794 after the French Revolution, when the National Convention created the École normale supérieure, the mathematician Gaspard Monge and Lazare Carnot created the École centrale des travaux publics (later École polytechnique), and the abbot Henri Grégoire created the Conservatoire national des arts et métiers.

The model was probably the military academy at Mézières, of which Monge was an alumnus. The system of competitive entry was used as a means to open up higher education to more candidates based on merit.

Some schools included in the category have roots in the 17th and 18th centuries and are older than the term grande école, which dates to 1794. Their forerunners were schools aimed at graduating civil servants, such as technical officers (Ecole d'Arts et Métiers, renamed Arts et Métiers ParisTech, established in 1780), mine supervisors (École des mines de Paris established in 1783), bridge and road engineers (École royale des ponts et chaussées established in 1747), and shipbuilding engineers (École des ingénieurs-constructeurs des vaisseaux royaux established in 1741).

Five military engineering academies and graduate schools of artillery were established in the 17th century in France, such as the école de l'artillerie de Douai (established in 1697) and the later école du génie de Mézières (established in 1748), wherein mathematics, chemistry and sciences were already a major part of the curriculum taught by first-rank scientists such as Pierre-Simon Laplace, Charles Étienne Louis Camus, Étienne Bézout, Sylvestre-François Lacroix, Siméon Denis Poisson, Gaspard Monge (most of whom were later to form the teaching corps of École Polytechnique during the Napoleonic era).

In 1802, Napoleon created the École spéciale militaire de Saint-Cyr, which is also considered a grande école, although it trains only army officers.

During the 19th century, a number of higher-education grandes écoles were established to support industry and commerce, such as École nationale supérieure des Mines de Saint-Étienne in 1816, École supérieure de Commerce de Paris (today ESCP Business School, founded in 1819), L'institut des sciences et industries du vivant et de l'environnement (Agro ParisTech) in 1826, and École centrale des Arts et Manufactures (École centrale Paris) in 1829. 

During the latter part of the 19th century and in the 20th century, more grandes écoles were established for education in businesses as well as newer fields of science and technology, including Rouen Business School (NEOMA Business School) in 1871, Sciences Po Paris in 1872, École nationale supérieure des télécommunications in 1878, Hautes Études commerciales in 1881, École supérieure d'électricité in 1894, Ecole des hautes Etudes commerciales du Nord in 1906 , Ecole Supérieure des Sciences économiques et commerciales in 1907, and Supaero in 1909.

Since then, France has had a unique dual higher education system, with small and middle-sized specialized graduate schools operating alongside the traditional university system. Some fields of study are nearly exclusive to one part of this dual system, such as medicine in universités only, or architecture in écoles only.

The grande école (and "prépa") system also exists in former French colonies, Switzerland, and Italy (Napoleon, as king of Italy for ten years, established the French system there). The influence of this system was strong in the 19th century throughout the world, as can be seen in the original names of many world universities (Caltech was originally "Polytechnic Institute", as was ETH Zürich—"the Polytechnicum"—in addition to the Polytechnique in Montréal. Some institutions in China, Russia, the UK, and the US also have names of some French grandes écoles, adapted to their languages). The success of the German and Anglo-Saxon university models from the late 19th century reduced the influence of the French system in some of the English-speaking world.

Today 

There is no standard definition or official list of grandes écoles. The term grande école is not employed in the French education code, with the exception of a quotation in the social statistics. It generally employs the expression of "écoles supérieures" to indicate higher educational institutions that are not universities.

The Conférence des grandes écoles (CGE) (Grandes Écoles Conference) is a non-profit organization. It uses a broad definition of grande école, which is not restricted to the school's selectivity or the prestige of the diploma awarded. The members of CGE have not made an official or "accepted" list of grandes écoles. For example, some engineering school members of the CGE cannot award state-recognized engineering degrees.

Admission to grandes écoles 

Admission to grandes écoles is different from that to French universities. To be admitted into most French grandes écoles, most students study in a two-year preparatory program in one of the CPGEs (see below) before taking a set of competitive national exams. Different exams are required by groups (called "banques") of different schools. The national exams are sets of written tests, given over the course of several weeks, that challenge the student on the intensive studies of the previous two years. During the summer, those students who succeed in the written exams then take a further set of exams, usually one-hour oral exams, during which they are given a problem to solve. After 20 minutes of preparation, the candidate presents the solution to a professor, who challenges the candidate on the answer and the assumptions being made. Afterwards, candidates receive a final national ranking, which determines admission to their grande écoles of choice.

Preparatory classes for grandes écoles (CPGE) 

Classes préparatoires aux Grandes Écoles (CPGE), or prépas (preparatory classes for grandes écoles), are two-year classes, in either sciences, literature, or economics. These are the traditional way in which most students prepare to pass the competitive recruitment examination of the main grandes écoles. Most are held in state lycées (high schools); a few are private. Admission is competitive and based on the students' lycée grades. Preparatory classes with the highest success rates in the entrance examinations of the top grandes écoles are highly selective. Students who are not admitted to the grande école of their choice often repeat the second year of preparatory classes and attempt the exam again the following year.

There are five categories of prépas:

 Scientifiques:  These prepare for the engineering schools and teach mathematics, physics, chemistry, and technology. They are broken down in sub-categories according to the emphasis of their dominant subject: they are mainly focused on mathematics and either physics (MP), industrial sciences and technologies (TSI), physics and chemistry (PC), physics and engineering science (PSI), physics and technology (PT) and chemistry, physics and technology (TPC) .
 BCPST: biology, chemistry, physics, geology, and mathematics. Commonly called "Agro-Véto", these classes prepare students primarily for agricultural and veterinary schools, but also for schools in geology, hydrology, and forestry, as well as for research and teaching careers via the Écoles normales supérieures.
 Lettres: humanities, essentially for the Écoles normales supérieures (students can also compete to enter business schools, but represent a small minority of those admitted). There are two main sub-categories: "Lettres", in either "A/L" (with Ancient Greek and/or Latin) or LSH (with geography), and B/L (with mathematics and social sciences).
 Économique et commerciale: mathematics and economics. These prepare for the entrance exams to the French business schools, and are subdivided between science (mathematics) and economics tracks - a third track also exists for students with a "technological", i.e. applied background.
 Chartes: humanities, with an emphasis on philology, history and languages, named after the school École nationale des Chartes. By far the smallest prépa in number of students.

Recruitment at baccalauréat level 

Some schools are accessible after a selection based on the grades of the two last years of lycée (High school) and/or the baccalaureate (High school diploma) results. For example, in engineering, the most attractive and selective ones are the seven schools composing the INSA network, but there are dozens of selective engineering schools accessible directly after the baccalaureate. Some famous ones are the three Universités de Technologie or the thirteen schools of Polytech Group. It is also possible to join these schools in third year after a preparatory class or university and then the recruitment is based on a contest or the student results.

The top five of these engineering grandes écoles (among 77), according to the French magazine l'Etudiant magazine, are in 2021 INSA Lyon, UTC, UTT, INSA Toulouse, ESIEE Paris and ESILV - Paris-La Défense.

Most of them simply include the two-year preparatory class in their program while others like INSA Toulouse chose the LMD to start the specialization earlier. Most students choose to get their licence, master or doctorate close to home.

These years of preparation can be highly focused on the school program so students have a greater chance of succeeding in the admission exam or contest in their school if there is one, but they are not prepared to take the examinations for other schools so their chance of success in these other examinations is low.

The advantage is that instead of studying simply to pass the admission exams, the student will study topics more targeted to their training and future specialization. The main advantage is that students choose their speciality more according to their interests and less according to their rank. (Indeed, the rank obtained after standard preparatory classes determines a list of schools with their specialities).

The selection process during the first preparatory year is considered less stressful than in a standard first preparatory class. Nevertheless, the selection percentage can be the same as during standard preparatory classes. These schools also recruit people who did not manage to follow the programs of CPGE.

Parallel admission 

The prépa years are not required to sit the entrance exams. Moreover, in many schools, there is also the possibility of “parallel admission” to a grande école. Parallel admissions are open to university students or students from other schools that decide not to take the entrance exams. This method of recruitment is proving increasingly popular, with many students choosing to first go to a university and then enroll in a grande école.

Some grandes écoles have a dual diploma arrangement in which a student can switch establishments in the last year to receive diplomas from both establishments.

Faculty in Grande Ecoles

Full-time researchers and teaching faculty 
Full-time faculty researchers to assume their responsibility as teaching staff by giving lectures, accompanying students in their projects, participating in the campus life and representing the school during symposia.

Their contractual number of working hours is defined at the beginning of each academic year in a lump sum workload timetable.

Full-time faculty/teaching are in charge of giving lectures, but also shoulder pedagogic coordination. As such, they are deeply involved in their respective campus' life and accountable for the teaching quality as well as the pedagogic continuous improvement of the School.

Prominent professors: according to L'Etudiant, a prominent professor is permanent professor, holding a PhD from a French or foreign Higher Education Institution which is AACSB- or EQUIS-accredited and ranked amongst the Shanghai 2019 top 500 ranking.

Adjunct professors 
Adjunct Professors hold chair in another Higher Education Institution. Their teaching conditions are various, but not always stipulated in a contractual form.

Visiting professors are teaching staff which hold a chair along another activity, e.g. a consultant or entrepreneur giving lectures once or twice a week.

Guest professors are international professors who take part in special lectures, classes or programme.

Categories 

Grandes écoles can be classified into following broad categories:

Écoles normales supérieures 

These schools train researchers and professors and may be a beginning for executive careers in public administration or business. Many French Nobel Prize and Fields Medal laureates were educated at the École Normale Supérieure in Paris, Lyon or Paris-Saclay. There are four ENS:

 the École Normale Supérieure of Paris, nicknamed "Ulm" from its address rue d'Ulm (Ulm Street) (sciences and humanities);
 the École Normale Supérieure de Lyon in Lyon (sciences and humanities);
 the École normale supérieure Paris-Saclay, near Paris (sciences, engineering, social sciences, economics and management, foreign languages).
 the École Normale Supérieure de Rennes near Rennes (sciences, engineering, social sciences, economics and management, sport).

Until recently, unlike most other grandes écoles, écoles normales supérieures (ENS) did not award specific diplomas. Students who completed their curriculum were entitled to be known as "ENS alumni" or "normaliens". The schools encourage their students to obtain university diplomas in partner institutions while providing extra classes and support. Many ENS students obtain more than one university diploma. Normaliens from France and other European Union countries are considered civil servants in training (unless they were recruited by parallel admission), and as such are paid a monthly salary in exchange for agreeing to serve France for ten years, including those years spent as students.

Engineering schools (grandes écoles d'ingénieurs) 

Many engineering schools recruit most of their students who have completed their education in scientific preparatory classes (2 years of post-baccalaureat study). Many are also joint graduate schools from several regional universities, sometimes in association with other international higher education networks.

In France, the term 'engineer' has a broader meaning compared to the one understood in most other countries and can imply a person who has achieved a high level of study in both fundamental and applied sciences, as well as business management, humanities and social sciences. The best engineering schools will often provide such a general and very intensive education, although this is not always the case. Most of the schools of the following first four groups train the so-called 'generaliste' engineers:

1. Centrale Graduate Schools of engineering; its students are commonly known as pistons (a reference to the piston engine, one of the centrepieces of industrial revolution):
 CentraleSupélec, which is the result of the 2015 merger between École centrale Paris (ECP or Centrale Paris) founded in 1829, and École Supérieure d'Electricité (or Supélec) founded in 1894.
 École centrale de Lille (ECLi, EC-Lille or Centrale Lille)
École centrale de Lyon (ECL, EC-Lyon, or Centrale Lyon) was founded in 1857 as the École centrale lyonnaise pour l'Industrie et le Commerce
École centrale de Marseille (ECM, EC-Marseille, or Centrale Marseille)
École centrale de Nantes (ECN, EC-Nantes, or Centrale Nantes)
École centrale Casablanca

2. ParisTech schools of engineering (however, some of these schools are now part of the new Paris-Saclay University. Also some of these schools teach only a specific area):
 Arts et Métiers ParisTech (École nationale d'Arts et Métiers previously called ENSAM or les Arts et Metiers or "Les Arts", administered by the French Ministry of National Education, Higher Education and Research) 
 École nationale supérieure de chimie de Paris (Chimie ParisTech)
 École nationale de la statistique et de l'administration économique (ENSAE ParisTech) – formed by the Institut National de la Statistique et des Études Économiques (INSEE : French Statistical Authority) and administered by the French Ministry for the Economy and Finance;
 École nationale des ponts et chaussées (École des Ponts ParisTech, administered by the French Ministry of Ecology, Sustainable Development and Energy, nicknamed les Ponts) – founded in 1747
 École nationale supérieure de techniques avancées (ENSTA ParisTech) administered by the French Ministry of Defense 
 École nationale supérieure des mines de Paris (MINES ParisTech, administered by the French Ministry for Industry) –
 École nationale supérieure des télécommunications (Télécom Paris, administered by the French Ministry of Industry) – part of Institut Télécom
 École polytechnique (l'X) – Engineering school in France, administered by the French Ministry of Defense;
 École supérieure de physique et de chimie industrielles de la ville de Paris (ESPCI ParisTech)
 Institut d'Optique Graduate School (IOGS, nicknamed SupOptique);
 Institut des sciences et industries du vivant et de l'environnement (AgroParisTech) - administered by the French Ministry of Agriculture

3. Institut National des Sciences Appliquées (INSA) network is the largest engineer training group in France, with 16,700+ students, administered by the French Ministry of National Education. It consists of grandes écoles distributed throughout mainland France:
 Institut National des Sciences Appliquées de Lyon – founded in 1957
 Institut National des Sciences Appliquées de Toulouse – founded in 1963
 Institut National des Sciences Appliquées de Rennes – founded in 1966
 Institut National des Sciences Appliquées de Rouen – founded in 1985
 Institut National des Sciences Appliquées de Strasbourg – founded in 2003
 Institut National des Sciences Appliquées de Centre Val de Loire – founded in 2014

4. Instituts polytechniques

 the Institut polytechnique de Grenoble: includes the Grenoble Institute of Technology, and the Grenoble INP (formerly INPG) which has six departments (ENSIMAG, Ense3, Phelma, ESISAR, Génie Industriel, Pagora);
 the Institut National Polytechnique de Lorraine: includes the EEIGM, the European School of Materials Sciences and Engineering, the École Nationale Supérieure d'Agronomie et des Industries Alimentaires (ENSAIA, the National School of Agronomy and Food Sciences), the École Nationale Supérieure d'Électricité et de Mécanique (ENSEM, the National School of Electricity and Mechanics), the École Nationale Supérieure de Géologie (ENSG), the École nationale supérieure en génie des systèmes et de l'innovation (ENSGSI, the National School of Industrial Systems and Innovation), the École Nationale Supérieure des Industries Chimiques (ENSIC, the National School of Chemical Industries), the École Nationale Supérieure des Mines de Nancy (ENSMN, the National School of Mines of Nancy) and the École Nationale Supérieure d'Architecture de Nancy (ENSA Nancy, the School of Architecture));
 the Polytechnic Institute of Bordeaux : includes the ENSC, the ENSEIRB-MATMECA, the ENSCBP, the ENSTBB, the ENSEGID, and the ENSPIMA;
 the Polytechnic Institute of Clermont-Auvergne: includes the École polytechnique universitaire de Clermont-Auvergne, the Institut d'informatique d'Auvergne, the SIGMA Clermont.

5. Réseau Polytech schools of engineering, is a French network of 15 graduate schools of engineering within France's leading technological universities. All schools in the Group offer Master of Engineering degrees in various specialities:

 Polytech Angers
 École polytechnique de l'université de Lorraine (Polytech Nancy) 
 Polytech Grenoble
 Polytech Lille
 Polytech Lyon
 Polytech Marseille
 Polytech Montpellier
 Polytech Clermont-Ferrand
 Polytech Nantes
 Polytech Nice Sophia
 Polytech Orleans
 Polytech Sorbonne, in the Sorbonne University
 Polytech Paris-Saclay, component of the Paris-Saclay University.
 Polytech Savoie
 Polytech Tours
6. Écoles Nationales Supérieures d'Ingénieurs (ENSI), which encompasses approximately 40 grandes écoles:
 the École nationale supérieure d'électronique, d'électrotechnique, d'informatique, d'hydraulique, et de télécommunications (ENSEEIHT, nicknamed N7), considered the largest ENSI, with more than 400 graduates every year. It is one of the schools of the INP Toulouse;
 the École nationale supérieure d'ingénieurs de Caen (ENSICAEN);
 the École nationale supérieure d'ingénieurs de Bretagne Sud (ENSIBS);
 the École nationale supérieure d'ingénieurs de Poitiers (ENSI Poitiers);
 the École d'ingénieurs ENSIL-ENSCI (ENSIL-ENSCI);
 the École nationale supérieure en génie des systèmes et de l'innovation (ENSGSI);
 the École nationale supérieure des arts et industries textiles (ENSAIT);
 the École Nationale Supérieure d'Ingénieurs en Informatique Automatique Mécanique Énergétique Électronique (ENSIAME);

7. Institut Mines-Telecom schools of engineering
 École Nationale Supérieure des Mines Telecom Atlantique Bretagne Pays de la Loire (Telecom Bretagne and École des Mines de Nantes, merged 2017);
 École nationale supérieure des mines d'Albi
 École nationale supérieure des mines d'Alès
 École des Mines-Télécom de Lille-Douai (IMT Lille Douai)
 École nationale supérieure des mines de Paris (MINES ParisTech)(also member of ParisTech);
 École nationale supérieure des mines de Nancy
 École nationale supérieure des mines de Saint-Étienne
 École nationale supérieure des mines de Rabat
 École nationale supérieure des télécommunications (TELECOM ParisTech) 
 Telecom SudParis (ex - Telecom INT). On the campus of Telecom & Management SudParis.
 Télécom Physique Strasbourg (ex - ENSPS)
 Institut Eurécom

8. École Nationale d'Ingénieurs (ENI) network is an engineer training group:
 the École nationale d'ingénieurs de Brest (ENIB)
 the École nationale d'ingénieurs de Metz (ENIM )
 the École Nationale d'Ingénieurs de Saint-Étienne (ENISE)
 the École nationale d'ingénieurs de Tarbes (ENIT)

9. Universités de technologie (UT) group: Compiègne (UTC), Troyes (UTT); Belfort-Montbéliard (UTBM)

10. Conservatoire National des Arts et Métiers

The following schools usually train each student for a more specific area in science or engineering:

11. Grandes écoles of Actuarial Sciences, Statistics and Econometrics
 the Institut de Science Financiere et d'Assurances (ISFA);
 the Institut de Statistiques de l'Université de Paris (ISUP).

12. Grandes écoles of Chemistry
 the École supérieure de chimie physique électronique de Lyon (ESCPE, or CPE-Lyon);
 the École nationale supérieure de chimie de Rennes (ENSCR);
 the École nationale supérieure de chimie de Lille (ENSCL);
 the École Nationale Supérieure de Chimie de Montpellier (ENSCM);
 the École européenne de Chimie, Polymères et Matériaux de Strasbourg (ECPM);

13. Grandes écoles of Physics
 the École supérieure de chimie physique électronique de Lyon (ESCPE, or CPE-Lyon);
 the Institut d'Optique Graduate School (IOGS, nicknamed SupOptique);
 the École supérieure de physique et de chimie industrielles de la ville de Paris (ESPCI ParisTech);
 the École nationale supérieure de chimie et de physique de Bordeaux (ENSCPB);
 the École nationale supérieure des ingénieurs en arts chimiques et technologiques (ENSIACET, nicknamed A7), also part of the INP Toulouse;
 the École nationale supérieure de l'électronique et de ses Applications (ENSEA);
 the Institut des sciences de l'ingénieur de Toulon et du Var (ISITV).

14. Grandes écoles of Information Technology and Telecommunications
 The École Centrale d'Électronique (ECE Paris);
 the École nationale des sciences géographiques (ENSG - géomatique);
 the École supérieure d'informatique, électronique et automatique (ESIEA);
 the École pour l'informatique et les techniques avancées (EPITA);
 the École nationale supérieure d'électronique, informatique et radiocommunications de Bordeaux (ENSEIRB);
 the École supérieure angevine en informatique et productique (ESAIP);
 the École supérieure d'électronique de l'Ouest (Groupe ESEO);
 the École supérieure d'ingénieurs en génie électrique (ESIGELEC);
 the École catholique des arts et métiers (ECAM Lyon - Groupe ECAM);
 the École d'électricité, de production et des méthodes industrielles (EPMI - Groupe ECAM);
 the École d'ingénieur généraliste en informatique et technologies du numérique (EFREI);
 the École Internationale des Sciences du Traitement de l'Information (EISTI, now called CY Tech);
 the École nationale supérieure d'informatique pour l'industrie et l'enterprise (ENSIIE, previously IIE);
 the Institut supérieur d'électronique de Paris (ISEP);
 the Institut Superieur de l'electronique et du numerique (ISEN);
 the Institut d'informatique d'Auvergne (ISIMA);
 the Institut des Sciences et Techniques des Yvelines (ISTY);
 Telecom Nancy (ex - ESIAL);
 Télécom Saint-Étienne.

15. Grandes écoles of Applied Physics and Technology or Civil and Industrial Engineering
 the École des ingenieurs de la Ville de Paris (EIVP);
 the École nationale de l'aviation civile (ENAC), French civil aviation University;
 the École nationale supérieure de mécanique et d'aérotechnique (ENSMA, or ISAE-ENSMA, Mechanical Engineering);
 the École Nationale Supérieure de Mécanique et des Microtechniques (ENSMM, Mechanical Engineering);
 the École Supérieure d'Ingénieurs en Électrotechnique et Électronique (ESIEE Paris, Electrical & Computer Engineering / Industrial Engineering), administered by the French Ministry for the Economy and Finance - ESIEE Paris was established in 1904 and is part of the ESIEE network of graduate schools (Official website in English);
 the École Supérieure d'Ingénieurs en Électrotechnique et Électronique d'Amiens (ESIEE Amiens);
the École Nationale des Travaux Publics de l'État (ENTPE, nicknamed TPE, Civil Engineering);
 the École Nationale Supérieure des Sciences Appliquées et de Technologie (ENSSAT);
 the École supérieure des techniques aéronautiques et de construction automobile (ESTACA or ISAE-ESTACA, Mechanical Engineering)
 the École spéciale des travaux publics, du Bâtiment et de l'Industrie (ESTP, Civil Engineering);
 the Institut polytechnique des sciences avancées (IPSA, Aeronautical and Aerospace Engineering);
 the Institut supérieur de l'aéronautique et de l'espace (ISAE-SUPAERO) - was formed by a merger of two institutes known as SUPAERO and ENSICA in Toulouse
 the Institut supérieur des matériaux du Mans (ISMANS);
 the École nationale supérieure de techniques avancées de Bretagne (ENSTA Bretagne, formerly ENSIETA), training French military engineers (25%) and civilian engineers (75%);
 the Institut Supérieur de Mécanique (SUPMECA, Mechanical Engineering);

 the SIGMA Clermont (chemistry, mechanics)

16. Grandes écoles of Biology and other Natural Sciences
 the École nationale supérieure agronomique (ENSA),  Paris (AgroParisTech), Montpellier (SupAgro), Rennes (Agrocampus Ouest), Toulouse (ENSAT), Nancy (ENSAIA), Bordeaux (Sciences Agro);
 the École supérieure de biotechnologie Strasbourg (ESBS);
 the École Nationale Supérieure de Géologie (ENSG), whose graduates are Géoliens;
 the Ecole et Observatoire des Sciences de la Terre (EOST), whose graduates are Eostiens;
 the École nationale du génie de l'eau et de l'environnement de Strasbourg (ENGEES);
 the École de Biologie Industrielle (EBI), whose graduates are Ebistes;
 the École supérieure d'agricultures d'Angers (ESA) ;
 the École d'ingénieurs de Purpan (EIPurpan), formerly École Supérieure d'Agriculture de Purpan (ESAP);
 the École nationale supérieure d'horticulture (ENSH);
 the Institut Sup'Biotech de Paris (Sup'Biotech).

17. Other private Grandes écoles offering multiple specialities

 the EPF School of Engineering known as "École Polytechnique Féminine", was only for women until 1994;
 the HEI - Hautes Etudes d'Ingénieur in Lille;
the ESTIA Institute of Technology (École supérieure des technologies industrielles avancées in Biarritz), founded in 1985. A generalist engineering school, former IDLS;
 the École Speciale de Mecanique et d'Electricite also called ESME Sudria in Paris since 1905;
 the École supérieure d'ingénieurs de recherche en matériaux et en InfoTronique (ESIREM);
 the Centre des études supérieures industrielles (CESI);
 the École supérieure d'ingénieurs de Rennes (ESIR);

Business schools (grandes écoles de commerce) 

Most French business schools are partly privately run, or managed by the regional chambers of commerce.

Business schools recruiting students just after taking the baccalauréat, most of them are private:

 European Business School Paris
 EDC Paris Business School
 ESCE International Business School
 ESDES School of Business and Management
 ESIEE Management
 ESSCA School of Management
 IESEG School of Management 
 IPAG Business School
 ISG Business School
 PSB Paris School of Business

The below list contains French business schools that are officially part of the Conférence des grandes écoles.

Business schools recruiting students from post-baccalaureat preparatory classes, high selectivity rate:

 Audencia Business School
 Burgundy School of Business (École supérieure de commerce de Dijon)
 École de management de Normandie (Normandy Business School)
 ESSEC Business School
 ESCP Business School
 ESC Rennes School of Business
 ESC La Rochelle
 ESC Clermont
 ESC Toulouse School of Business
 ESC Troyes
 Emlyon Business School
 EM Strasbourg Business School (École de Management de Strasbourg)
 EDHEC Business School (private)
 GRENOBLE ÉCOLE DE MANAGEMENT (GEM)
 Groupe ESC Pau
 HEC Paris
 ICN Business School
 INSEEC Business School (private)
 Institut supérieur du commerce de Paris (ISC Paris, private)
 KEDGE Business School
 Montpellier Business School 
 NEOMA Business School
 Skema Business School
 Institut Mines-Télécom Business School
Campus Saint Marc (École de Management et de Communication à Rouen)

Business schools recruiting students with professional experience:

 INSEAD (Institut Européen d'Administration des Affaires)

Grandes écoles without preparatory classes 

Some schools are accessible after a competitive entrance exam directly after the baccalauréat. Often, students of these schools will progress to an administrative school.

These schools include:

 École du Louvre, for archaeology, history of art and anthropology;
 École des Hautes Études en Sciences Sociales (EHESS), trains researchers in Social and Human Sciences, for sociology, history, geography, anthropology, linguistics, statistics;
 École Nationale Supérieure des Arts Décoratifs,
 École Nationale Supérieure des Beaux-Arts, best known as "les Beaux-Arts" (for fine arts), École Nationale Supérieure d'Arts à la Villa Arson;
 École Nationale Supérieure de Création Industrielle,
 École nationale supérieure d'architecture de Lyon (ENSAL), for architecture;
 École Nationale Supérieure d'Architecture de Versailles (ENSAV), for architecture;
 École Nationale Supérieure d'Architecture de Saint-Etienne (ENSASE), for architecture;
 Instituts Nationaux des Sciences Appliquées (INSA) in Lyon, Rennes, Rouen, Strasbourg, Toulouse, Centre-Val de Loire (located in Blois and Bourges) delivering diplôme d'ingénieur degrees in five years including two preparatory years. The three remaining years are also accessible after selection for the best students graduating a first cycle university diploma, or from institutes of technology;
 Universités de Technologies (UTC, UTT, UTBM) in Compiègne, Troyes, Belfort, are also independent national schools delivering diplôme d'ingénieur and selecting students that graduated baccalaureat with top honours.

Universities that have joined the Conférence des grandes écoles 
In 2014, Paris-Dauphine University joined the Conférence des grandes écoles and now has the status of university, grand établissement, and grande école.

 Paris-Dauphine University.

Schools for Political Studies, Social Sciences and International Affairs 

These schools train students in multidisciplinary fields of social and human studies. Students are prepared for civil service and other public-sector leader positions, but more and more of them do end up working in the private sector. Some of these schools are reserved for French or EEA citizens only.

Institut d'études politiques (IEP, Sciences Po)

 Sciences Po (also known as Sciences Po Paris, most prestigious and selective among all)
Sciences Po Bordeaux
 Sciences Po Lille
 Sciences Po Rennes
 Sciences Po Strasbourg
 Sciences Po Aix
 Sciences Po Lyon
 Sciences Po Grenoble
 Sciences Po Saint-Germain-en-Laye
 Sciences Po Toulouse
École Nationale d'Administration, whose alumni are known as énarques and generally take up high-level management positions in government, ministries and institutions. It was closed on 31 December, 2021 and replaced by the Institut National du Service Public. (INSP)
École Nationale de la Magistrature (Bordeaux) (ENM), which trains judicial magistrates;
École nationale supérieure des sciences de l'information et des bibliothèques (Lyon) (ENSSIB), which trains library and information managers;
École des Hautes Études en Santé Publique (Rennes), trains managers of hospitals and other leaders and technical experts in public health and health care;

Military officer academies 
Today, there are only 3 grandes écoles that are officially denominated as military academies of the French Republic.
 The École Spéciale Militaire de Saint-Cyr, formerly located in Saint-Cyr-l'École but now in Coëtquidan in Brittany, is the Army Academy. Nicknamed Saint-Cyr, its graduates and students are cyrards but are generally referred to as saint-cyriens;
 The École de l'Air (EA) is the Air Force Academy, located in Salon-de-Provence;
 The École Navale (EN) is nicknamed Navale and its graduates and students are Bordaches. It is located in Brest.

While École polytechnique is also under supervision of the French Ministry of Defence, it is no longer officially a military academy. Only a small number of its students progress to military careers, while between a fifth and a quarter choose to remain in France to work for the State's technical administrations; the majority of its graduates choose to work abroad either in US or UK.

There are also other specialized military "grandes écoles":

 The École de santé des armées, located in Lyon for the training of army doctors and pharmacists.
 The École nationale de la sécurité et de l'administration de la mer  for the military officers and civil servants of the French Maritime Administration
 The École des commissaires des armées (ECA), training militatry officers in charge of all the support functions (management, purchasing, finance, human support, human resources, legal advice, decision support, logistics)

Communication, Journalism & Media schools 

 CELSA Paris-Sorbonne

Facts and influence in French culture 

Altogether, grandes écoles awarded approximately 60,000 master's degrees in 2013, compared with 150,000 master's degrees awarded by all French higher institutions in the same year, including universities.

Grande école graduates in 2013 represent 10% of the French population graduating from high school 5 years before (600,000 in 2008).

Some grandes écoles are renowned in France for their selectivity and the complexity of their curriculum. In the press, they are usually called the "A+" schools, referring to the grade given by some rankings. These elite schools represent less than 1% of the higher education students in France.

Admission to a certain number of these institutions (e.g. l'Ecole Nationale de la Magistrature in Bordeaux) is reserved only to French citizens, raising questions relating to European mobility and institutional reciprocity.

Since 1975, the Comité d'études sur les formations d'ingénieurs has studied the questions of training and job placement for engineers graduating from grandes écoles.

Notable alumni 

Of the 29 persons who have served as President of France, 17 attended a Grande école.

Many winners of the Nobel prize attended a Grande école

See also
 Academic grading in France
 Commission des titres d'ingénieur
 Conférence des directeurs des écoles françaises d'ingénieurs (CDEFI)
 Conférence des grandes écoles (CGE)
 Education in France
 Grands établissements
 List of universities in France
 List of public universities in France
 Superior Graduate Schools in Italy

References 

 
Educational institutions in France
Public universities in France

/ref>
 The École des commissaires des armées (ECA), training militatry officers in charge of all the support functions (management, purchasing, finance, human support, human resources, legal advice, decision support, logistics)